Huainan United University is a university in the Chinese city of Huainan.

Universities and colleges in Anhui
Huainan